Gnetum gnemon is a species of Gnetum native to southeast Asia and the western Pacific Ocean islands, from Mizoram and Assam in India, south and east through Indonesia and Malaysia to the Philippines, Fiji, and Hawaii in the United States. Common names include gnetum, joint fir, two leaf, melinjo, belinjo, bago, and tulip.

Description 

It is a small to medium-size tree (unlike most other Gnetum species, which are lianas), growing to 15–22 m tall and with a trunk diameter of up to 0.40 cm (0.16 in). The leaves are evergreen, opposite, 8–20 cm long and 3–10 cm broad, entire, emerging bronze-coloured, maturing glossy dark green. The fruit-like female strobilus consist of little but skin and a large nut-like seed 2–4 cm long inside. Male strobili are small, arranged in long stalks, and are often mistaken for flowers.This species of gymnosperm can be easily confused for an angiosperm due to the fruit-like female strobili, broad leaves and male strobili looking like flowers due to convergent evolution.

In addition to the tree form, there are also varieties that includes shrub forms (brunonianum, griffithii, and tenerum).

Fleshy strobili weigh about 5.5 g, the seed alone 3.8 g. Strobili mature mainly from June to September in NE Philippines. The red (ripe) strobili are eaten by birds, mammals and reptiles.

Uses 

Gnetum nuts are eaten boiled, roasted, or raw in most parts of Southeast Asia and Melanesia. The young leaves, flowers, and the outer flesh of the fruits are also edible when cooked and are eaten in Indonesia, the Philippines, Thailand, Vanuatu, Papua New Guinea, the Solomon Islands, and Fiji. They have a slightly sour taste and are commonly eaten in soups and stews.

Gnetum is most widely used in Indonesian cuisine where it is known as melinjo or belinjo.  The seeds are used for sayur asem (sour vegetable soup) and also, made into raw chips that later need to be deep-fried as crackers (emping, a type of krupuk).  The crackers have a slightly bitter taste and are frequently served as a snack or accompaniment to Indonesian dishes.

This plant is commonly cultivated throughout the Aceh region and is regarded as a vegetable of high status. Its male strobili, young leaves and female strobilus are used as ingredients in traditional vegetable curry called . In the Pidie district, the women pick the red-skinned ripe fruit and make  from it.

Phytochemicals 

Recently, it has been discovered that melinjo strobili are rich in a stilbenoid composed of resveratrol and identified as a dimer. This result was published in XXIII International Conference on Polyphenols, Canada, in 2006.

Melinjo resveratrol, having antibacterial and antioxidative activity, works as a food preservative, off flavour inhibitor and taste enhancer. This species may have applications in food industries which do not use any synthetic chemicals in their processes.

Four new stilbene oligomers, gnemonol G, H, I and J, were isolated from acetone extract of the root of Gnetum gnemon along with five known stilbenoids, ampelopsin E, cis-ampelopsin E, gnetin C, D and E.

The extraction of dried leaf of Gnetum gnemon with acetone water (1:1) gave C-glycosylflavones (isovitexin, vicenin II, isoswertisin, swertisin, swertiajaponin, isoswertiajaponin).

The separation of a 50% ethanol extract of the dried endosperms yielded gnetin C, gnetin L (new stilbenoid), gnemonosides A, C and D, and resveratrol which were tested for DPPH radical scavenging action, antimicrobial activity and inhibition of lipase and α-amylase from porcine pancreas. Gnetin C showed the best effect among these stilbenoids.

Oral administration of the 50% ethanol extract of melinjo fruit at 100 mg/kg/day significantly enhanced the production of the Th1 cytokines IL-2 and IFN-γ irrespective of concanavalin-A stimulation, whereas the production of the Th2 cytokines IL-4 and IL-5 was not affected. New stilbene glucosides gnemonoside L and gnemonoside M, and known stilbenoids resveratrol, isorhapontigenin, gnemonoside D, gnetins C and E were isolated from the extract. Gnemonoside M strongly enhanced Th1 cytokine production in cultured Peyer's patch cells from mice at 10 mg/kg/day.

References

External links 

Gnetaceae
Edible nuts and seeds
Indonesian cuisine